John Mathias Engler (born October 12, 1948) is an American businessman and politician who served as the 46th governor of Michigan from 1991 to 2003. A member of the Republican Party, he later worked for Business Roundtable, where The Hill called him one of the country's top lobbyists.

Engler has spent most of his adult life in government. He was serving in the Michigan Senate when he enrolled at Thomas M. Cooley Law School and graduated with a Juris Doctor degree, having served as a Michigan State senator since 1979. He was elected Senate majority leader in 1984 and served there until being elected governor in 1990.

Engler served on the board of advisors of the Russell Kirk Center for Cultural Renewal, an educational organization that continues the intellectual legacy of noted conservative and Michigan native Russell Kirk. Engler also served on the board of trustees of the Marguerite Eyer Wilbur Foundation, which funds many Kirk Center programs. Engler was a member of the Annie E. Casey Foundation board of trustees until 2014. As of 2018, he serves on the board of directors of Universal Forest Products. Previous board service included serving as a director of Dow Jones and Delta Air Lines and as a trustee of Munder Funds.

Early life and education
Engler, a Roman Catholic, was born in Mount Pleasant, Michigan, on October 12, 1948, to Mathias John Engler and his wife, Agnes Marie (née Neyer), but grew up on a cattle farm near Beal City.

He attended Michigan State University, graduating with a degree in agricultural economics in 1971, and Thomas M. Cooley Law School, graduating with a Doctor of Jurisprudence degree in 1981.

He was elected to the Michigan House of Representatives as a state representative in 1970 at the age of 22. He served in the House from 1971 to 1978. His campaign manager in that first election was a college friend, Dick Posthumus. Engler later became the first Republican youth vice-chair for the Michigan Republican Party, defeating future U.S. Senator Spencer Abraham. Posthumus later went on to be elected a state senator, Senate Majority Leader and Lieutenant Governor. He was Engler's running mate in the 1998 election and served from 1999 to 2003.

Career

Governorship
Engler's administration was characterized by privatization of state services, income tax reduction, a sales tax increase, educational reform, welfare reform, and major reorganization of executive branch departments.

In 1996, he was elected chairman of the Republican Governors Association, and in 2001, he was elected to head the National Governors Association.

In 2002, near the end of his final term, Engler and the Michigan Department of Environmental Quality attempted to negotiate a consent order with Dow Chemical that would have resulted in a ninefold increase in the allowable levels of dioxins. The consent order would have resulted in Dow not having to pay to clean up high levels of toxins in Midland, Michigan, near its plant there, as well as in the Tittabawassee flood plain, which had been contaminated by dioxins dumped into the river from the facility and from overflow from waste ponds. The consent order fell through in late 2002.

Vice presidential speculation

1996
During the 1996 presidential election, Engler was considered to be a potential vice presidential running mate for Republican nominee Bob Dole. However, Dole instead selected Jack Kemp, a former representative and HUD secretary.

2000
Engler endorsed Texas Governor George W. Bush in the 2000 Republican primary. After Bush secured the GOP nomination, Engler's name was again floated as a possible running mate. In his book Decision Points, Bush says that Engler was someone he was "close" with and could "work well with." Ultimately, Engler was passed over for the running mate position in favor of Dick Cheney. After the election, Engler's close political ally Spencer Abraham, who narrowly lost his re-election bid for the Senate to Debbie Stabenow, was chosen as Bush's Secretary of Energy.

2002 elections
Engler's lieutenant governor, Dick Posthumus, sought to succeed Engler in the 2002 gubernatorial race. Posthumus lost the race to the state's attorney general, Democrat Jennifer Granholm.

Election results
In 1990, Engler, then the state senate majority leader, challenged Governor James Blanchard in his bid for a third term. Political observers viewed his bid as a long shot, and he trailed Blanchard by double digits in the polls the weekend before the election. However, on election day, Engler pulled off the upset, defeating Blanchard by approximately 17,000 votes—a margin of less than one percentage point. In 1994, Engler ran for his second term. The Democrats nominated former Representative Howard Wolpe, who had close ties to the labor movement—a potent force in Democratic politics in Michigan. Engler bested Wolpe 61 to 39 percent, and the state Republican Party made significant gains. Spencer Abraham picked up the Senate seat of retiring Democrat Donald Riegle. Republicans gained a seat to break a tie in the state House of Representatives, taking a 56–54 majority, while also picking up a seat in the U.S. House of Representatives. Republican Candice Miller won an upset victory to win the post of Secretary of State.

Michigan voters re-elected Engler to his third and final term in 1998. He won a landslide victory over lawyer Geoffrey Fieger. Engler took 1,883,005 votes—62 percent of the total—to Fieger's 38 percent and 1,143,574 votes. Engler's landslide helped the state Republican Party to gain six seats in the state House of Representatives, taking control of the chamber they had lost two years previously with a 58–52 margin, as well as picking up an additional seat in the State Senate, for a 23–15 majority. Republicans also gained a seat on the technically non-partisan state Supreme Court, holding a 4–3 majority over the Democrats.

Electoral history

After governorship
After leaving the governor's mansion in January 2003, Engler served as president of the state and local government sector of Electronic Data Systems. Engler left that position in June 2004 to be elected president and CEO of the National Association of Manufacturers. Engler's tenure at the NAM ended in January 2011. In January 2011, Engler was named president of the Business Roundtable.

In 2017, Engler was appointed to a four-year term on the governing board of the National Assessment of Educational Progress project.

Interim presidency of Michigan State University
On January 30, 2018, Engler was named the interim president of Michigan State University to replace Lou Anna Simon, who was embroiled with the school in the USA Gymnastics sex abuse scandal involving Larry Nassar. The appointment of Engler sparked controversy due to his previous handling of sexual misconduct as governor of Michigan. Engler's tenure as interim president was plagued by controversies, brought on by Engler's apparent callous statements and actions toward survivors during Board of Trustees meetings and statements that were reported by the press. One on Nassar's victims, Rachael Denhollander, said Engler "chose to stand against every child and every sexual assault victim in the entire state, to protect an institution."

Engler resigned on January 16, 2019 after the Board of Trustees indicated its intent to ask him to resign following a series of embarrassing incidents regarding Nassar's victims and his responses to issues in the aftermath. Engler initially indicated he planned to resign on January 23, 2019 but the Board required him to resign the morning after he submitted his resignation letter.

Personal life

In 1974, Engler married Colleen House, who served in the Michigan House of Representatives and ran for lieutenant governor of Michigan in 1986. She filed for divorce in 1986.

Engler married Michelle DeMunbrun, a Texas attorney, December 8, 1990. The couple has triplet daughters born November 13, 1994. As First Lady, Michelle Engler served as the founding chair of the Michigan Community Service Commission. Michelle Engler was named to the Federal Home Loan Mortgage Corporation (Freddie Mac) board in 2001 by President George W. Bush and re-appointed in 2002.

References

Further reading

External links
 

|-

|-

|-

|-

|-

|-

|-

|-

|-

Republican Party governors of Michigan
Presidents of Michigan State University
Republican Party members of the Michigan House of Representatives
Republican Party Michigan state senators
Michigan State University alumni
Western Michigan University Cooley Law School alumni
College Republicans
Catholics from Michigan
People from Mount Pleasant, Michigan
Spouses of Michigan politicians
1948 births
Living people
20th-century American politicians
21st-century American politicians